Esplanade most commonly refers to a raised walkway.

Esplanade or The Esplanade may also refer to:

Walks, parks, and streets 

 Esplanade (Bronx), a street in New York City
 Esplanade (Hamburg), an avenue in Hamburg
 Esplanade, Kolkata, a neighbourhood in central Kolkata, India
 Esplanade, Penang, a waterfront location in the heart of George Town, Penang, Malaysia
 Esplanade, Singapore, a waterfront location just north of the mouth of the Singapore River in downtown Singapore
 Esplanade Avenue, New Orleans
 Esplanade Park, a park in the central district of Singapore
 Esplanade Park, Fremantle, a public reserve in Fremantle, Western Australia
 The Esplanade (Perth), a road in Perth, Western Australia
 Esplanade Reserve, a former heritage listed public space in Perth, Western Australia
 The Charles River Esplanade in Boston, Massachusetts
The Esplanade (Toronto), a street in Toronto close to Downtown
The Esplanade (Weymouth), a walkway and street on the seafront at Weymouth, Dorset, southern England
Esplanadi / Esplanaden, an urban park in Helsinki
The Esplanade, Olympic Park, Montreal

Venues, complexes, and buildings 
 Esplanade (Algonquin) refers to a mixed-use shopping, dining, living, and office complex in Algonquin, Illinois
 Esplanade Hotel (Melbourne), a live music venue in Melbourne, Australia
 Esplanade – Theatres on the Bay, a performance arts venue located at the Esplanade, Singapore
 The Regent Esplanade, a luxury hotel in Zagreb, Croatia
The Esplanade (Bangkok), a shopping mall in Bangkok, Thailand
The Esplanade (Kenner, Louisiana), a shopping mall in Kenner, Louisiana
The Esplanade, a Mississippi Landmark

Stations 
 Elizabeth Quay Bus Station, Perth, Western Australia, known as the Esplanade Busport until January 2016 
 Elizabeth Quay railway station, Perth, Western Australia, known as the Esplanade station until January 2016
 The Esplanade railway station, a former station in Fremantle, Western Australia
 Esplanade MRT station on the Circle line in Singapore
 Esplanade metro station on the Kolkata Metro
 Esplanade de La Défense (Paris Métro), a station on Paris Métro Line 1
 Ryde Esplanade railway station, in the town of Ryde on the Isle of Wight

Other 
 Esplanade Sandstone, which forms an esplanade, a geologic unit in Grand Canyon, and Arizona, Southwestern United States
 The Esplanade, a hot spring in Mammoth Hot Springs, Yellowstone National Park
 Esplanade, a Bayer Environmental Science brand name for several herbicide formulations containing indaziflam (sometimes as a mix with other herbicides)

See also 
 Esplanada (disambiguation)
 Esplanaden (disambiguation)
 Esplanade Mall (disambiguation)
 Hotel Esplanade (disambiguation)